Aswamedham was a reverse quiz program in Kairali TV, a Malayalam channel, in the format of twenty questions. It was one of the most successful programs in Kairali. This program, anchored by "Grandmaster" G. S. Pradeep, has entered the Limca Book of Records for the reaching 500 episodes. The second part of the program was started in November 2005 in Kairali TV. At one point, the Aswamedham set featured a galloping horse on a rotating pedestal.

The Tamil channel Vijay TV aired the Tamil version of the program starting June 2006 under the name Grandmaster with Pradeep and Shilpa Kavalam as the anchor. Shakthi TV is also airing the Tamil version of Aswamedham with the Sinhalese subtitles and is titled as Shakthi Grandmaster. In literature, Aswamedham also refers to a drama written in the same name by Thoppil Bhasi.

Notes

2000s Indian television series